Hanna Musleh is a Palestinian film maker and university professor.

Studies
Musleh was born in 1954 in Beit Jala to Wahbe and Nijmeh Musleh where he attended the Mennonite School. He studied at Leningrad State University in Russia for a degree in anthropology and Manchester University in England afterwards. Since 1980 he has worked as a professor at Bethlehem University teaching cultural studies, history, anthropology film appreciation, religion and philosophy where he remains with his Russian wife Lilia and their son Alexander.

Filmography
Sahar’s Wedding (1991) - a wedding in Al-Khader, a small village outside of Bethlehem under Israeli occupation during the first Intifada.
International Centre of Bethlehem (ICB) debate TV show series - chronicles Palestinian self-determination, physically disabled Palestinians, Palestinian suffering, emotional Palestinian biographies, individual Palestinian despair, Palestinian elections, Palestinian health, Palestinian water deficiency
Cairo International Festival for Children’s Cinema - the life of Palestinian children who suffered permanent disabilities in the ongoing violence in the Holy Land: awarded with the Golden Award for a Short Film.
 We are God’s Soldiers - two brothers, one supporting Fatah, the other Hamas
Palestinian Sign Language - Palestinian kids with special needs
I Am a Little Angel - Palestinian girls going through Israeli checkpoints
In the Spider’s Web 
Walling In Walling Out: A Bethlehem Story.

See also
Raymonda Tawil

References

1954 births
Living people
Palestinian film directors
Palestinian expatriates in the United Kingdom
Palestinian educational theorists